Clanculus undatoides is a species of sea snail, a marine gastropod mollusk in the family Trochidae, the top snails.

Description
The height of the shell attains 10 mm, its diameter also 10 mm. The rather small, somewhat solid shell is turbinately conoid. It is opaque, reddish rose with indistinct purple spots. The 5½ flat whorls increase rapidly in size. They are  margined below, girdled with 6 series of rounded granules, of which the lowest line is the smallest. They increase gradually in size to the suture, which is coronate and broadly canaliculate. The base is flattened, ornamented with 8 spiral lines of close rose colored granules. The rhomboid aperture contains a thickened lip, which is lirate inside. The columella has two obtuse, blunt tubercles above and below, and intermediate small obsolete teeth. The narrow umbilicus is white, with a rather conspicuous white margin.

Distribution
This marine species is endemic to Australia and occurs off New South Wales and  Victoria.

References

 Tenison-Woods, J.E. 1879. On some new marine shells. Proceedings of the Linnean Society of New South Wales 4(1): 21-24 
 Hedley, C. 1918. A checklist of the marine fauna of New South Wales. Part 1. Journal and Proceedings of the Royal Society of New South Wales 51: M1-M120
 Iredale, T. & McMichael, D.F. 1962. A reference list of the marine Mollusca of New South Wales. Memoirs of the Australian Museum 11: 1-10
 Wilson, B. 1993. Australian Marine Shells. Prosobranch Gastropods. Kallaroo, Western Australia : Odyssey Publishing Vol. 1 408 pp
 Jansen, P. 1995. A review of the genus Clanculus Montfort, 1810 (Gastropoda: Trochidae) in Australia, with description of a new subspecies and the introduction of a nomen novum. Vita Marina 43(1-2): 39-62

External links
 To Biodiversity Heritage Library (2 publications)
 To World Register of Marine Species
 

undatoides
Gastropods of Australia
Gastropods described in 1879